Pollak is an Austrian surname, and is a variant of Polak usually of Jewish Ashkenazic origin, it originates as an ethnic surname for Jews between Austria, Poland and Germany. It may refer to:

Athletes
 Burglinde Pollak (1951–), German athlete
 Egon Pollak (1898–1994), Austrian football player 
 James Howard Pollak Jr. (1963–), American cyclist
 Jaroslav Pollák (1947–), Slovak football player
 Josef Pollák, Czech orienteering competitor 
 Mike Pollak (1985–), American football player
 Zoltán Pollák (1984–), Hungarian football player

Other people
 Felix Pollak (1909–1987), American poet
 Henry O. Pollak (1927–), Austrian-American mathematician 
 Jacob Pollak (c. 1460–1541), Polish rabbi, founder of the Pilpul method of halakic study
 Joachim Pollak (1798–1879), Austrian rabbi
 Joel Pollak (1977–), American politician and author
 Jonathan Pollak (1982–), Israeli anarchist
 Katherine Pollak Ellickson (1905-1996), American labor economist
 Kay Pollak (1938–), Swedish film director
 Kevin Pollak (1957–), American comedian and actor
 Leo Wenzel Pollak (1888–1964), Czechoslovakian meteorologist
 Linsey Pollak, Australian musician and composer
 Louis H. Pollak (1922–2012), American district court judge and dean of Yale Law School and the University of Pennsylvania Law School
 Mimi Pollak (1903–1999), Swedish actress
 Oskar Pollak, Czech art historian
 Otto Pollak (1908–1998), American sociologist
  (1880–1962), Austrian violinist and violin teacher
 Seth Pollak, American psychologist
 Stuart R. Pollak (1937–), American judge

See also 
Pollack (disambiguation)
 Public Utilities Commission of the District of Columbia v. Pollak
 Shass Pollak (Jewish mnemonist group)

Slavic-language surnames
Jewish surnames
Ethnonymic surnames